Julius Kariuki (born June 12, 1961) is the winner of the 3,000 m steeplechase at the 1988 Summer Olympics.

Born in Nyahururu, Kenya, Kariuki's athletic career started slowly. He made his international debut at the 1984 Summer Olympics, where he finished seventh in the 3000 m steeplechase.

The following year, Kariuki won the steeplechase at the African Championships in Athletics, and then followed that up with a victory in a slow race at the IAAF World Cup. At the Seoul Olympics, Kariuki was mostly considered as the third-string Kenyan runner, but in the final, after a very fast start, Kariuki and his fellow countryman Peter Koech broke clear, and a lap later, Kariuki sped away from his more experienced teammate, and went on to win the gold medal. He slowed down in the last few metres and finished in a time of 8:05.51, just outside Henry Rono's world record of 8:05.40.

In 1989, Kariuki won the 10,000 m at the Universiade and the 3000 m steeplechase again in the IAAF World Cup. In 1990, he won gold easily at the Commonwealth Games and finished fourth at the following year's World Championships. Kariuki remained one of the world's top steeplechasers for several more years after that, but the dominance of Kenyan talent was so great, that he was never able again to gain representation on the national team to a major international championship.

References 

Kenyan male steeplechase runners
Olympic athletes of Kenya
Athletes (track and field) at the 1984 Summer Olympics
Athletes (track and field) at the 1988 Summer Olympics
Athletes (track and field) at the 1990 Commonwealth Games
Olympic gold medalists for Kenya
Commonwealth Games gold medallists for Kenya
1961 births
Living people
Commonwealth Games medallists in athletics
Junior college men's track and field athletes in the United States
Medalists at the 1988 Summer Olympics
Olympic gold medalists in athletics (track and field)
Universiade medalists in athletics (track and field)
Universiade gold medalists for Kenya
Medalists at the 1989 Summer Universiade
Medallists at the 1990 Commonwealth Games